In mathematics, the Freidlin–Wentzell theorem (due to Mark Freidlin and Alexander D. Wentzell) is a result in the large deviations theory of stochastic processes.  Roughly speaking, the Freidlin–Wentzell theorem gives an estimate for the probability that a (scaled-down) sample path of an Itō diffusion will stray far from the mean path.  This statement is made precise using rate functions.  The Freidlin–Wentzell theorem generalizes Schilder's theorem for standard Brownian motion.

Statement
Let B be a standard Brownian motion on Rd starting at the origin, 0 ∈ Rd, and let Xε be an Rd-valued Itō diffusion solving an Itō stochastic differential equation of the form

where the drift vector field b : Rd → Rd is uniformly Lipschitz continuous.  Then, on the Banach space C0 = C0([0, T]; Rd) equipped with the supremum norm ||·||∞, the family of processes (Xε)ε>0 satisfies the large deviations principle with good rate function I : C0 → R ∪ {+∞} given by

if ω lies in the Sobolev space H1([0, T]; Rd), and I(ω) = +∞ otherwise.  In other words, for every open set G ⊆ C0 and every closed set F ⊆ C0,

and

References
  
   (See chapter 5.6)

Asymptotic analysis
Stochastic differential equations
Theorems in statistics
Large deviations theory
Probability theorems